Gabriele Alexandra Lesser (born 16 May 1960 in Frankfurt am Main) is a historian and journalist, who specializes in the history of World War II and the occupation of Poland, the Baltic countries, and Ukraine 1939–1945.

As Warsaw-based correspondent of newspapers published in Germany (Taz-Berlin), Austria (Standard-Vienna), and Switzerland (Tages-Anzeiger-Zurich) she publishes regularly news, reportages, analysis about Ukraine, Poland, Estonia, Latvia, Lithuania, and the Kaliningrad oblast. She wrote and edited several books about the contemporary Poland, the history of the Underground University in Cracow in World War II and a guidebook about Masuria and the Masurian Lakeland.

References

1960 births
Living people
20th-century German historians
German women historians
German women journalists
German newspaper journalists
20th-century German journalists
21st-century German journalists
Die Tageszeitung people
20th-century German women writers
21st-century German women writers
21st-century German historians